Musim Mas (Musim Mas Group) operates globally across the palm oil business spectrum with an operational presence in 13 countries across Asia-Pacific, Europe, North and South America. The group owns one of the largest palm oil refinery networks in the world, operating in the vegetable oil refining business. It also manufactures consumer goods in Indonesia, producing soap and cooking oil brands. Musim Mas has a 37,000-strong workforce, supported by a comprehensive logistical network of chemical and costal tankers, barges, tugboats and bulk installations at major ports across Indonesia and other strategic parts of the world.

Musim Mas is the first company in Indonesia to attain the Roundtable on Sustainable Palm Oil (RSPO) certification, and its Executive Chairman sat on RSPO's first executive board. According to Channel News Asia, the Group championed sustainability and adopted green initiatives in its operations even before environmental protection became a buzzword. Apart from oil palm, the Group also dabbles in real estate and owns the 4-star Mikie Holiday Resorts in Berastagi, North Sumatra.

The group launched a sustainability policy at end-2014, committing itself to the principles of no deforestation, respecting of human rights and social contribution to the lives of local peoples. Notably, Musim Mas is the only major southeast Asian palm oil company to join the Palm Oil Innovation Group (POIG), which works to provide innovative solutions to the issues within the palm oil industry. They are also taking part in the fire-free alliance programme to work with local peoples to solve the issue to fire and haze which affects millions of people in the region annually. In 2015, Musim Mas collaborated with the International Finance Corporation (IFC) - part of the World Bank Group, to help small farmers in Indonesia to improve their farming and alleviate sustainability issues linked to oil palm small farmers' productivity and farming patterns.

Musim Mas Group has a focus on sustainable palm oil production and takes active steps to reduce its Greenhouse Gas emissions by capturing methane gas – a waste gas which is 34 times more toxic than carbon dioxide –, and turning the gas into energy to power their mills and estates. The methane capture facilities (also known as Biogas plants) are fitted for all of Musim Mas' mills. In 2021, Musim Mas announced a partnership with AAK and Nestlé to address deforestation outside of plantation concession areas in Aceh, Indonesia. The partnership will reach out to approximately 1,000 oil palm independent smallholders within two years and enroll them in Musim Mas’ smallholders program supported by a Smallholders Hub.

Management 
Musim Mas is a family-owned private company run by brothers Mr Bachtiar Karim, Mr Bahari Karim, and Mr Burhan Karim

Subsidiaries 
Musim Mas merchandises and distributes its products via its marketing arm, Inter-Continental Oil and Fats Pte. Ltd. (ICOF). Based in Singapore, ICOF serves all the major markets in the world, offering a comprehensive range of tropical oils and derivative products.

Maschem B.V., a wholly owned subsidiary of the Musim Mas Group, has developed a state-of-the-art Ethoxylation Facility at the site of Dow Benelux B.V. in Terneuzen. The facility will produce surface active agents or more commonly known as surfactants based on alcohols, oils, esters, fatty acids and amines. The surfactants produced are used as raw materials in personal care products and detergents.

Milestones

1932 
 Nam Cheong Soap Factory was founded by Anwar Karim in Medan, North Sumatra.

1970 
 The first palm oil refinery was commissioned in Belawan, Indonesia.

1972 
 PT Musim Mas was established in Tanjung Mulia, Medan, Indonesia.

1988 
 Musim Mas started its plantation in Rantau Prapat, North Sumatra.

1990 
 Musim Mas commissioned its first kernel crushing plant in Medan, Indonesia.

1991 
 Musim Mas commissioned its first palm oil mill in Rantau Prapat, North Sumatra, Indonesia.

1992 
 Musim Mas was the first to be awarded Indonesian Best Exporter Award (Primaniyarta Award). Musim Mas goes on to win this award multiple times.

2002 
 Musim Mas started going global. Set up its first subsidiary office, Inter-Continental Oils and Fats (ICOF) Malaysia in Malaysia.

2003 
 Musim Mas started operations for its oleochemicals plant in Medan Industrial Area II (KIM II).

2004 
 PT Musim Mas joined the Roundtable on Sustainable Palm Oil (RSPO), and was also RSPO's first member from Indonesia. The Group's President Director served on RSPO's first executive board.

2007 
 Musim Mas established its first office in Europe.

2008 
 Musim Mas established its first office in the United States of America.

2009 
 PT Musim Mas attained RSPO certification, becoming the first plantation in Indonesia to do so. The Musim Mas Group started operations in Nellore, India, and Dongguan, China.

2010 
 Musim Mas initiated its entry into the bioenergy market.

2012 
 Musim Mas was the first major group to be certified for all of its plantations in Indonesia by the Roundtable on Sustainable Palm Oil (RSPO).

2013 
 Musim Mas established its first office in Vietnam. It also became the first company to receive the Indonesia Sustainable Palm Oil (ISPO) certification.

2014 
 Musim Mas released a new sustainability policy, indicating that their palm oil will be deforestation free.
 Musim Mas commissioned three biodiesel plants in Europe and first refinery in Tanjung Langsat, Malaysia.

2015 
 Musim Mas joins the Palm Oil Innovation Group (POIG), deemed as the 'gold standard' of the production of palm oil. Musim Mas' membership entry to the Palm Oil Innovation Group is seen in the industry as a stamp of validation for the company, as the founding members of the group include NGOs who have been vocal about the environmental impacts of palm oil.

2016 
 Musim Mas joins the Fire Free Alliance (FFA).
 Musim Mas Acquired a glycerin refinery in Groningen, The Netherlands.

2017 
 Musim Mas Group established a joint venture with Genting Plantations to set up a refinery in Lahad Datu, Malaysia. Sulfation plant in Barbastro, Spain has been acquired.

2019 
 Musim Mas Group became the first company in Southeast Asia to attain POIG verification and also first mill to be certified with RSPO P&C 2018. The Group also launched Novel IDEAS Center, a S$10 million R&D and Innovation facility, located in the heart of the Singapore Science Park. Novel IDEAS Center is part of Musim Mas Group's strategic expansion and innovation goals.

2021 
 Musim Mas Group has been recognised as one of the world's most environmentally-friendly palm oil producers with a strong Environmental, Social and Governance (ESG) standing according to SPOTT, a commissioned commodity producers insights platform developed by Zoological Society of London which analysed the performance of 100 of the world's leading palm oil companies. Musim Mas ranked higher than competitors which include IndoFood Agri Resources, Cargill, ADM (company), Louis Dreyfus Company, Sime Darby, and Bunge Limited, achieving a total score of 88.6%, the 3rd highest ranking out of 100 palm oil producers. To support Musim Mas green efforts, UOB has extended its green trade financing facilities to the Group.

Products 
Musim Mas' products include Biodiesel, Bleaching Earth, Bypass Fats/ Rumen Bypass Fats, Commodities, Cooking Oil, Emulsifier – Stabilizer Blends, Emulsifiers, Esters, Fatty Acids, Fatty Alcohols, Household Products, Margarine / Shortening, Medium-Chain Triglycerides, Palm Wax, Refined Glycerine, Soap / Skin Care / Hygiene Products, Soap Noodles, Specialty Application Oils, Specialty Fats, Surfactants, Vitamin E. In 2021, Musim Mas was ranked 9th on FoodTalks' Global Top 30 Specialty Oil Companies list.

Brands 
As a fully integrated palm oil business, the Group offers an extensive portfolio of over 70 proprietary brands distributed across the world, producing cooking oils, margarines, and soaps. Their wide range of brands include the well-known Lervia, Medicare, and Harmony soaps, Sunco cooking oil, Surya Gold, Margareta, and Rajni Gold. A new subsidiary Kevolve Dr MCT was launched to sell premium MCT oil products.

Philanthropy 
 Donated $2 million to establish the Musim Mas Professorship in Sustainability at the NUS Business School.
 PT Musim Mas adopt the Flying Squad, an initiation collaboration by World Wide Fund for Nature (WWF) on helping to reduce human-elephant conflict in Tesso Nilo National Park.
 Musim Mas was actively engaged in philanthropic efforts during the COVID-19 pandemic. The conglomerate made one of the largest donations that year, adding up to $5 million during the circuit-breaker period in Singapore to assist vulnerable families and individuals to tide through the pandemic. Donations were made to five different local beneficiaries in Singapore, including the Alzheimer's Disease Association, the Metta Welfare Association, The Majurity Trust, The Straits Times School Pocket Money Fund and The Singapore General Hospital.

References

External links 

 
 
 
 
 

Palm oil companies of Indonesia
Palm oil companies
Palm oil companies of Malaysia
Singaporean brands
Agriculture companies established in 1932